The 1977–78 Japan Ice Hockey League season was the twelfth season of the Japan Ice Hockey League. Six teams participated in the league, and Kokudo Keikaku won the championship.

Regular season

External links
 Japan Ice Hockey Federation

Japan
Japan Ice Hockey League seasons
Japan